Leland Eric Johnson (born November 27, 1961) is a former United States professional football punter who played 18 seasons in the National Football League (NFL). Throughout the course of his career, he played for the Houston Oilers, Cleveland Browns, Cincinnati Bengals, New England Patriots, Minnesota Vikings, and Philadelphia Eagles. Before his NFL career, Johnson played college football for Brigham Young University (BYU).

Johnson was born in Conroe, Texas and was a punter and kicker for McCullough High School in The Woodlands, Texas.

Johnson was a punter for BYU and was a member of the 1984 National Championship team. He was nicknamed "Thunderfoot" while at BYU. Johnson was an All-American selection in 1984.

After graduating college, Johnson was selected by the Houston Oilers in the fifth round of the 1985 NFL Draft.

In his 18 seasons, Johnson played in 259 games and recorded 1,226 punts for 51,979 yards and 317 punts in the 20, with 142 touchbacks.  His 70-yard punt in 1990 was the longest of the season, and he led the NFL with a 38.5 net yard average in 1995.  At the time of his retirement, his 51,979 punting yards were the third most in NFL history behind Sean Landeta and Jeff Feagles.

Johnson's most successful years in the NFL were with the Bengals, where he spent 11 of his 18 seasons and made a championship game appearance in Super Bowl XXIII.  In that game, Johnson set a record for the longest punt in Super Bowl history (63 yards).  By 1998, Johnson had become extremely frustrated with Cincinnati, which had not recorded a winning season since 1990.  After a 33–20 loss at home during the 1998 season, Johnson publicly denounced Bengals management and said if he was a Cincinnati fan with season tickets, he would probably sell them.  Johnson was cut by the Bengals the following day, and subsequently signed with the Patriots in the following season.  He left the Bengals as their all-time leading punter with 746 punts for 32,196 yards and 186 punts in the 20.

Johnson was the Patriots punter for the next two years, but was cut by the team five games into the 2001 season.  He spent the rest of the year with the Vikings and played his final season with the Eagles before retiring from the NFL at age 41.

Post-football
Johnson is a mountain cyclist, having competed in the Leadville 100 nine times, with a personal best time of 9 hours 27 minutes. Johnson owns a barbecue restaurant, Five Star BBQ, with two others, in Orem, Utah.

Further reading
Ludwig, Chick. Cincinnati Bengals, The Legends. Willmington, Ohio: Orange Frazer P, 2004.

External links
Database Football: Lee Johnson statistics

1961 births
Living people
Latter Day Saints from Texas
American football punters
BYU Cougars football players
Houston Oilers players
Cleveland Browns players
Cincinnati Bengals players
New England Patriots players
Minnesota Vikings players
Philadelphia Eagles players
Players of American football from Dallas